The Kop van Overijssel (English: Head of Overijssel) is a region in the very northwestern part of the Dutch province of Overijssel. It consists of the municipality of Steenwijkerland and matches the historical region of the Land van Vollenhove. In past times it comprised a wider area, the municipalities of Kampen, Zwartewaterland and Staphorst also belonging to it.

The Kop van Overijssel has about 43,000 inhabitants and an area of about 322 km², of which a tenth is water. The 'capital' is Steenwijk. Other noteworthy places are Blokzijl, Giethoorn (a 'Venice of the North') and Vollenhove.

The region is nearly surrounded by three provincial borders: in the west that of Flevoland (Noordoostpolder region), in the north that of Friesland (Stellingwerven region) and in the east that of Drenthe (the municipalities of Westerveld and Meppel). In the south it borders on Salland, another region of Overijssel.

In the is a marsh of about 60 km², Nationaal Park Weerribben-Wieden. It is a national park that contains the lakes Beulakerwijde and Belterwijde.

Gallery

References

External links 
  Tourist guide

 
Regions of Overijssel
Regions of the Netherlands